The World Day for the End of Speciesism (WoDES) is an international event aimed at denouncing speciesism, which is discrimination against non-human animals on the basis of their species. WoDES has been held annually at the end of August since 2015. A similar event called the World Day Against Speciesism is held on 5 June each year.

See also 
 World Day for Laboratory Animals
 World Day for the End of Fishing

References

External links 
 

Animal rights movement
Annual events
International observances